Bruff is a surname. Notable people with the surname include:

Charles Mackenzie Bruff (1887–1955), Norwegian chemist
Joseph Goldsborough Bruff (1804-1889), American draftsman and cartographer
Jules Bruff, American actress and filmmaker
Peter Bruff (1812–24 February 1900), English civil engineer